Leon Everette Baughman (born June 21, 1948) is an American country music artist.

Background
He was born in Aiken, South Carolina, United States. While in the Navy during the Vietnam War, Everette won a singing contest and decided to pursue a career in country music. Between 1977 and 1985, Everette recorded eight studio albums, including five for the RCA Nashville label. He charted several singles on the Hot Country Songs charts in the same timespan. Everette reached top 10 on the Hot Country Songs charts with the singles "Over", "Giving Up Easy", "Hurricane", "Midnight Rodeo", "Just Give Me What You Think Is Fair", "Soul Searchin'", "My Lady Loves Me (Just as I Am)" and "I Could'a Had You".

Discography

Studio albums

Extended plays

Singles

References

External links
Leon Everette's latest videos can be found here

1948 births
American country singer-songwriters
Living people
RCA Records Nashville artists
Mercury Records artists
People from Aiken, South Carolina
Country musicians from South Carolina
Singer-songwriters from South Carolina